Laszlo Toth (born 1 July 1938) is a Hungarian-born Australian geologist. He achieved worldwide notoriety when he vandalised Michelangelo's Pietà statue on 21 May 1972. He was not charged with a criminal offence after the incident, but was hospitalized in Italy for two years. On his release, he was immediately deported to Australia.

Early life
Toth was born in Pilisvörösvár, Hungary, to a Roman Catholic family. After graduating in geology, in 1965 he moved to Australia. As his English was poor and his geology diploma was not recognized, he initially worked at a soap factory. In June 1971 he moved to Rome, Italy, knowing no Italian, intending to become recognized as Christ. He sent letters to Pope Paul VI and unsuccessfully attempted to meet him.

Vandalism of Pietà
On 21 May 1972, at 33 years of age (Jesus's traditional age at death), on the Feast of Pentecost, Toth, wielding a geologist's hammer and shouting, "I am Jesus Christ—risen from the dead", attacked Michelangelo's Pietà statue in St. Peter's Basilica, Vatican City. With fifteen blows he removed Mary's arm at the elbow, knocked off a chunk of her nose, and chipped one of her eyelids. He was subdued by bystanders, including American sculptor Bob Cassilly, who struck Toth several times before pulling him away from the Pietà. In view of his apparent mental instability, Toth was never charged with the crime. On 29 January 1973, he was committed to an Italian psychiatric hospital. He was released on 9 February 1975 and immediately deported back to Australia, where authorities did not detain him.

Literature and popular culture
 Toth is the eponymous inspiration for books of letters by Don Novello.
 Comic book artist Steve Ditko used Toth's actions as the central metaphor in his 1992 examination of issues concerning creation and destruction, Lazlo's Hammer (corrected to "Laszlo's Hammer" in subsequent reprints and revisions).
 Australian cartoonist Michael Leunig published two Christmas cartoons in the Nation Review in 1975 under the nom de plume Laszlo Toth.
 Toth is referenced in "Dough, Ray and Me", the eighth episode of the thirteenth season of the animated television series Archer.

See also
 List of messiah claimants
 List of people claimed to be Jesus
 Messiah complex

References

1938 births
Hungarian emigrants to Australia
Australian prisoners and detainees
Prisoners and detainees of Italy
Australian people imprisoned abroad
Art crime
Living people